Girdled identifies various animal species:

Girdled lizards
Lizards from the genus Cordylus.
Angolan girdled lizard (Cordylus angolensis), also known as the Angolan spiny-tailed lizard
Black girdled lizard (Cordylus niger), restricted to Table Mountain on the Cape Peninsula and a population near Langebaan
Cape Girdled Lizard (Cordylus cordylus), indigenous to the southern Cape region of South Africa
Dwarf Karoo girdled lizard (Cordylus aridus), a species of lizard in the family Cordylidae
Giant girdled lizard (Cordylus giganteus), the sungazer, giant spiny-tailed lizard, giant zonure, the largest species of girdled lizard
Lawrence's girdled lizard (Cordylus lawrenci), a species of lizard in the family Cordylidae
Limpopo girdled lizard (Cordylus jonesii) live along South Africa's border with Botswana, Zimbabwe, and Mozambique
Machadoe's girdled lizard (Cordylus machadoi), a flattened girdled lizard from northwestern Namibia
Mclachlan's girdled lizard (Cordylus mclachlani) is a species of lizard in the family Cordylidae
Mozambique girdled lizard (Cordylus mossambicus), a large, flattened girdled lizard found in the Gorongosa Mountains in Mozambique
Rhodesian girdled lizard (Cordylus rhodesianus), exported from Mozambique for the pet trade
Transvaal girdled lizard (Cordylus vittifer), a very flattened girdled lizard from northeastern South Africa, Swaziland, and southeastern Botswana
Ukinga girdled lizard (Cordylus ukingensis), a poorly known species of girdled lizard from central Tanzania
Warren's girdled lizard (Cordylus warreni), a relatively large flattened lizard from the Lebombo Mountains in northeastern South Africa and eastern Swaziland

Other lizards
Armadillo girdled lizard (Ouroborus cataphractus), a species of lizard in the family Cordylidae
Blue-spotted girdled lizard (Ninurta coeruleopunctatus), endemic to southern, coastal South Africa
Madagascar girdled lizard or Madagascar plated lizard (Zonosaurus madagascariensis), a species of lizard in the family Gerrhosauridae
Prickly girdled lizard or spiny crag lizard (Pseudocordylus spinosus), a species of lizard in the family Cordylidae
Zoutpansberg girdled lizard (Smaug depressus), a species of lizard in the family Cordylidae

Other animals
Blue girdled angelfish (Pomacanthus navarchus), a marine angelfish from the Indo-Pacific region
Black-girdled barbet (Capito dayi), a bird in the family Ramphastidae, found in Bolivia and Brazil
Girdled Cardinalfish (Taeniamia zosterophora), native to the western Pacific Ocean from Indonesia to Vanuatu and from the Ryukyus to Australia
Girdled wrasse (Notolabrus cinctus), a fish of the genus Notolabrus, found around the South Island of New Zealand

See also
Girdle
Girdling
Girdled grapes

Girdled